Elatine triandra is a species of flowering plant belonging to the family Elatinaceae.

Its native range is Temperate and Subtropical Old World to Western Malesia.

References

Elatinaceae